Donald Edward Rosenblum (June 3, 1929 – September 6, 2022) was a United States Army Lieutenant General. He is an alumnus of The Citadel, Class of 1951.

Military career
As a second lieutenant, Rosenblum served during the Korean War as a Platoon Leader with Company E, 224th Infantry Regiment, a unit of the 40th Infantry Division; one of his fellow platoon leaders in Company E was Edward C. Meyer.

In the early 1960s, Rosenblum was assigned to the Special Warfare Office of the Army's Office of the Chief of Research and Development. In 1963 he graduated from the United States Army Command and General Staff College. He was executive secretary of the Army Scientific Advisory Panel from 1965 to 1966 as a major.

Rosenblum commanded a battalion of the 101st Airborne Division in Vietnam during the Vietnam War. He graduated from the United States Army War College in 1969. In his second Vietnam tour, he was commander of the Division Support Command (DISCOM) for the 101st.

As a major general, Rosenblum commanded the 24th Infantry Division from 1975 to 1977; he also served as Deputy Chief of Staff for Training at the United States Army Training and Doctrine Command as well as Deputy Commanding General of the XVIII Airborne Corps.

As a lieutenant general, Rosenblum was Commanding General of the First United States Army from 1981 until being succeeded by Charles D. Franklin in 1984. He retired to Savannah, Georgia, where he started a consulting firm, Rosenblum and associates. In 1990, he was awarded an honorary Doctor of Military Science degree from The Citadel. He died on September 6, 2022.

Awards and decorations

References

1929 births
2022 deaths
People from the Bronx
People from Savannah, Georgia
The Citadel, The Military College of South Carolina alumni
United States Army personnel of the Korean War
United States Army personnel of the Vietnam War
United States Army generals
Recipients of the Legion of Merit
United States Army Science Board people